Carellin Brooks is a Canadian writer, whose debut novel One Hundred Days of Rain won the Edmund White Award in 2016 and the ReLit Award for Fiction in 2017.

Background
Originally from Vancouver, British Columbia, after a tumultuous childhood, Brooks became a ward of the state. Placed with loving foster parents, she lived in Salt Lake City, Utah until age 14, when she ran away from her foster home and moved to Ottawa, Ontario to live with her grandmother. She completed high school in Ottawa, and was a regular youth columnist for the Ottawa Sun.

After high school, she studied English and anthropology at McGill University in Montreal. While at McGill, she won the national Book City/Books in Canada Student Writing Award for poetry in 1992 and hosted a weekly radio show, Dykes on Mikes, on CKUT-FM.

She was awarded a Rhodes Scholarship in 1993, and was reported at the time as the first person ever to have won a Rhodes scholarship while having been out as lesbian on her application. After completing her studies at Oxford University, she returned to Vancouver, becoming a columnist for Xtra West and a book reviewer for the Vancouver Sun. She later became managing editor of the Vancouver-based publishing company New Star Books, and is a writing instructor at the University of British Columbia.

Writing
She has published the non-fiction books Every Inch a Woman: Phallic Possession, Femininity, and the Text (2005), Wreck Beach (2007) and Fresh Hell: Motherhood in Pieces (2013), and edited the anthologies Bad Jobs: My Last Shift at Albert Wong's Pagoda and Other Ugly Tales of the Workplace (1998) on her own and Carnal Nation: Brave New Sex Fictions (2000) as coeditor with Brett Josef Grubisic.

Every Inch a Woman was a shortlisted Lambda Literary Award nominee in the LGBT studies category at the 19th Lambda Literary Awards in 2007.

One Hundred Days of Rain was the winner of the 2016 ReLit Award for Fiction and the Publishing Triangle's 2016 Edmund White Award for Debut Fiction.

Works

Written
Every Inch a Woman: Phallic Possession, Femininity, and the Text (2005)
Wreck Beach (2007)
Fresh Hell: Motherhood in Pieces (2013)
One Hundred Days of Rain (2015)

Edited
Bad Jobs: My Last Shift at Albert Wong's Pagoda and Other Ugly Tales of the Workplace (1998)
Carnal Nation: Brave New Sex Fictions (2000)

References

External links

20th-century Canadian women writers
21st-century Canadian novelists
Canadian women novelists
20th-century Canadian non-fiction writers
Canadian columnists
Canadian anthologists
Canadian literary critics
Women literary critics
Canadian Rhodes Scholars
Canadian LGBT novelists
Canadian lesbian writers
McGill University alumni
Alumni of the University of Oxford
Academic staff of the University of British Columbia
Writers from Vancouver
Writers from Ottawa
Living people
21st-century Canadian women writers
21st-century Canadian non-fiction writers
Canadian women non-fiction writers
Canadian women columnists
Year of birth missing (living people)
21st-century Canadian LGBT people
Lesbian novelists